The 2016 Erste Bank Open 500 was a men's tennis tournament played on indoor hard courts. It was the 42nd edition of the event, and part of the ATP World Tour 500 Series of the 2016 ATP World Tour. It was held at the Wiener Stadthalle in Vienna, Austria, from 24 October through 30 October 2016. First-seeded Andy Murray won the singles title.

Points and prize money

Point distribution

Prize money

Singles main-draw entrants

Seeds

 Rankings are as of October 17, 2016

Other entrants
The following players received wildcards into the singles main draw:
  Karen Khachanov
  Gerald Melzer 
  Jürgen Melzer

The following players received entry from the qualifying draw:
  Nikoloz Basilashvili
  Benjamin Becker 
  Damir Džumhur
  Jan-Lennard Struff

Withdrawals
Before the tournament
  Sam Querrey →replaced by  Nicolás Almagro
  Bernard Tomic →replaced by  Stéphane Robert

During the tournament
  David Ferrer

Retirements
  Pablo Cuevas
  Kyle Edmund

Doubles main-draw entrants

Seeds

 Rankings are as of October 17, 2016

Other entrants
The following pairs received wildcards into the doubles main draw:
  Julian Knowle /  Jürgen Melzer
  Dennis Novak /  Dominic Thiem

The following pair received entry from the qualifying draw:
  Guillermo Durán /  Mariusz Fyrstenberg

Finals

Singles

  Andy Murray defeated  Jo-Wilfried Tsonga, 6–3, 7–6(8–6)

Doubles

  Łukasz Kubot /  Marcelo Melo defeated  Oliver Marach /  Fabrice Martin, 4–6, 6–3, [13–11]

References

External links

 
 ATP tournament profile

Erste Bank Open
Vienna Open
Erste Bank Open